Smoking in Hungary is viewed as an important public health issue. Several studies have shown that smoking of tobacco or narcotics (e.g. cannabis) have different negative impacts on the society. (Vide Health effects of tobacco, Effects of cannabis) That is why this topic has come into discussion in different political, economical, scientific and medical forums.

Statistics
According to the World Health Organization 28.2% of the population were regularly smokers out of people aged 15 or above.

Laws
It has been forbidden to smoke in 5 meter radius from the entrance of primary schools, secondary schools, universities, dormitories and other higher education institutions. Furthermore, it is not allowed to smoke in public transport, pubs, bars, restaurants and in national institutions.

It is also forbidden for children under the age of 18 to buy cigarettes.

The sale of tobacco is limited to state-controlled (but privately owned) tobacco shops called Nemzeti Dohánybolt (National Tobacco Shop).

Politics
In 2013 the World Health Organization awarded Prime Minister Viktor Orbán in "accomplishments in the area of tobacco control".

Tobacco factories
In Hungary several types of cigarettes can be found. The three big tobacco companies in Hungary have producing facilities in the country.

There are also many import products on the market.

See also
 Smoking
 Prevalence of tobacco consumption

References

Health in Hungary